Squadron vice-admiral is a naval rank found in navies of the world which follow the French tradition of naval ranks. The squadron vice-admiral leads a squadron and is typically senior to a vice-admiral and junior to an admiral.

This translation is not often used in practice, as the rank is usually kept in the original language or rendered as vice-admiral. The main navy to use the rank of squadron vice-admiral is the French Navy, where it is a three-star rank with a NATO code of OF-8, equivalent to Army corps general or lieutenant general in seniority. Officially, it is not a rank, but a style and position bestowed upon some vice-admiral (which is the highest actual substantive rank and is a two-star rank with NATO code OF-7 equivalent to rear admiral (upper half) or major general).

Users

References

Admirals
Naval ranks